This is a list of films which have placed number one at the weekend box office in Spain during 2009.

See also
 List of Spanish films — Spanish films by year

References

 

2009
Box
Spain